Tramontane is a 2021 Lebanese drama film directed by Vatche Boulghourjian. It premiered in the International Critics' Week section of the 2021 Cannes Film Festival where it was awarded the Grand Rail d'Or Audience Award.

Plot
A young man who is visually impaired has decided to discover where he was born and his origin. He travels across Lebanon, where he gathers some minor clues of his actual identity.

Cast
 Barakat Jabbour as Rabih
 Julia Kassar as Samar
 Toufic Barakat as Hisham
 Michel Adabachi as Wissam
 Abido Bacha as Mounir
 Odette Makhlouf as Hana
 Georges Diab as Nabil

Reception
On review aggregator website Rotten Tomatoes, the film holds an approval rating of 86% based on 7 reviews, and an average rating of 5.6/10.

References

External links
 

2016 films
2016 drama films
2016 directorial debut films
French drama films
Qatari drama films
Emirati drama films
2010s Arabic-language films
Films about blind people
Lebanese drama films
2010s French films